Madhav Institute of Technology and Science, formerly known as Madhav Engineering College and commonly referred to as MITS Gwalior, is a government-aided autonomous institute founded in 1957 and located in Gwalior in the state of Madhya Pradesh, India. The institute is operated by the Scindia Engineering College Society. The institute offers bachelor's, master's and doctoral degrees in engineering along with Bachelor in Architecture and Master's in Computer Application.

History

Madhav Engineering College was established in 1957 by Maharaja Jivajirao Scindia. The foundation stone of the institute was laid by Dr. Rajendra Prasad, the former President of India, on 20 October 1956. The building was inaugurated on 11 December 1964 by Dr. S. Radhakrishnan, the former President of India.

The institute started with Bachelor of Engineering courses in civil, mechanical and electrical engineering. Postgraduate and Ph.D. courses in applied sciences were introduced in 1967. Undergraduate courses in electronics engineering and architecture were started in 1981 and 1984 respectively. The institute started a postgraduate course in Computer Application in 1986.

The institute offered a postgraduate course in civil engineering with specialization in construction technology and management in 1987. Postgraduate degrees in electronics and electrical engineering were started in 1995. A Bachelor of Engineering in computer science and engineering and chemical engineering were offered from 1994 and 1995 respectively. An information technology course was started in 2000. The president of the governing body is Jyotiraditya Scindia, who is also a Member of Parliament.

Campus

The institute is located on Race Course Road, Gwalior and is 2 km from Gwalior Junction railway station. The  campus is surrounded by educational institutions such as the Lakshmibai National University of Physical Education and the Rajmata Vijayaraje Scindia Krishi Vishwavidyalaya. The campus is divided into two zones, a residential zone with five hostels (three for males and two for females) and an academic zone. The Student Activity Center is a part of the academic zone and is mainly intended for extra-curricular activities. The SAC has a music room, a fiberglass basketball court, cricket ground and a volleyball court. The campus has a Central Computer Library available 8 hrs for the students and faculty.

Departments
MITS has several departments, with most focussing on a single engineering stream or science discipline:

Architecture
Automobile Engineering 
Chemical engineering
Civil engineering
Computer Science and Engineering
Electrical engineering
Electronic engineering
Humanities
Information Technology
Management
Mechanical engineering
Mathematics and Computing

Academic programmes
The institute's undergraduate programmes include the Bachelor of Engineering programme. It offers postgraduate level programmes like Master of Engineering, Master of Science, and Master of Science (Research). It offers a Ph.D. programme. The admission criteria for all these programmes is different at the entry level.

Undergraduate programmes
The institute offers a total of 500 seats for undergraduate programmes. There are also 15 seats for part-time students each in the civil engineering, electrical engineering and mechanical engineering departments. A Bachelor of Engineering is offered in ten areas; automobile, biotechnology, chemical, civil, computer science, electrical, electronics, electronics & telecommunication, information technology, and mechanical engineering. A Bachelor of Architecture is also offered. Admissions are through the Engineering Entrance Examination conducted by the Central Board of Secondary Education and counselling by the Directorate of Technical Education of Madhya Pradesh.

Postgraduate programmes
The institute offers postgraduate-level programmes in each department of engineering. There are a number of inter-disciplinary programmes available. At the postgraduate level, admissions are on the basis of the Graduate Aptitude Test in Engineering. Admissions to the Master of Computer Applications course is done on the basis of MP-MCA examination. Department of Management has full time 2 years of the Master of Business Administration (M.B.A.) program affiliated from the Jiwaji University, Gwalior.

Cultural and non-academic activities
Regular cultural and non-academics activities are organised by the students or the various departments of the institute. The most widely known event is Cyhper And Dy'signo, a carnival that attracts the participation of more than 1200 students from various schools, colleges and universities. In 2017 it was organised by TeamAudacious, a students chapter for enhancing technological aspects of the students of the college. It also conducts a 2-day fest 'Abhudaya' organised by MITS Journalism Society and also the literary carnival of Gwalior known as Mitsvah organised by the literary club of MITS known as Querencia which showcase the talents of various individuals by giving them a stage to show people what they got and learn some new things out of it.

Notable alumni 
 Raghunath Kashinath Shevgaonkar, Indian Institute of Technology Delhi
 S. K. Jain, chairman of the Governing Board of the World Association of Nuclear Operators (WANO)
 V. K. Saraswat, scientist, Padma Bhushan recipient
 Abhay Karandikar, educator, engineer and advisor}]

References

External links 
 

Engineering colleges in Madhya Pradesh
Universities and colleges in Gwalior
Educational institutions established in 1957
1957 establishments in Madhya Pradesh